This is a list of missile wings activated by the United States Air Force during and after the Cold War.  Although most of these wings included the word "missile" in their designations, the majority of units operating Convair SM-65 Atlas and Martin SM-68A Titan I intercontinental ballistic missiles were strategic wings or strategic aerospace wings, which combined missile, bomber and air refueling units.  The dates for these wings are the dates that they had missile squadrons assigned, rather than their activation and inactivation dates.

The list is organized numerically by weapons system designation, using the Air Force system in use until the tri-service aircraft designation system came into effect for missiles with such designation.  Within missile types, wings are ordered numerically by wing designation.

Martin TM-61 (MGM-1) Matador and TM-61B (TM-76, MGM-13B, CGM-13C) Mace

The Martin MGM-1 Matador was the first operational surface-to-surface cruise missile designed and built by the United States. The Matador included a radio command that allowed in-flight course corrections. The Matador was armed with the W5 warhead.

The Martin TM-76 Mace was originally the TM-61B, a tactical cruise missile developed as an improved TM-61 Matador. The MGM-13B was launched from a transporter erector launcher and the CGM-13C was launched from an underground bunker. While the MGM-13B was equipped with terrain-matching radar navigation, the CGM-13C used an inertial navigation system.

 Wings operating the TM-61 Matador and TM-76 Mace

Northrop SM-62 Snark

The Northrop SM-62 Snark was an early-model  intercontinental cruise missile that could carry a W39 warhead. The Snark was deployed from 1958 through 1961. It represented an important step in weapons technology during the Cold War.

 Wings operating the SM-62 Snark

Convair SM-65 (CGM-16D, CGM-16E, HGM-16F) Atlas

The Convair SM-65 Atlas was the United States' first successful ICBM, flown in 1957, and taken out of active service in 1965. Strategic Air Command deployed Atlas model D, Atlas model E, and Atlas model F. The Atlas used liquid fuel and it took 15 minutes to pump 249,000 pounds of propellant aboard the "quick firing" Atlas F. However, it was dangerous, as four Atlas silos were destroyed when propellant-loading exercises went awry.

 Wings operating the SM-65 Atlas

Martin SM-68A (HGM-25A) Titan I

The Martin HGM-25A Titan I was the United States' first multistage intercontinental ballistic missile. It required liquid fuel. Originally designed as a backup in case SM-65 Atlas missile development ran into problems, the Titan was ultimately beaten into service by Atlas. Deployment went ahead anyway to more rapidly increase the number of missiles on alert and because the Titan's missile silo basing was more survivable than Atlas.

 Wings operating the SM 68A (HGM-25A) Titan I

Martin SM-68C (LGM-25C) Titan II

The Martin LGM-25C Titan II carried a payload twice as heavy as the Titan I. It also used storable propellants, which reduced the time to launch and permitted it to be launched from its silo. Titan II carried the W53 warhead, making it the most powerful ICBM in the US arsenal. 

 Wings operating the SM 68C (HGM-25C) Titan II

Douglas SM-75 (PGM-17) Thor

The Douglas SM-75 Thor was the first operational ballistic missile of the United States Air Force (USAF). Named after the Norse god of thunder, it was deployed in the United Kingdom between 1959 and September 1963.

 Wings operating the SM-75 Thor

Boeing IM-99 (CIM-10) BOMARC

The Boeing IM-99 BOMARC (Boeing Michigan Aeronautical Research Center) was a supersonic ramjet powered long-range surface-to-air missile (SAM) used during the Cold War for the air defense of North America. In addition to being the first operational long-range SAM and the first operational pulse doppler aviation radar, it was the only SAM deployed by the United States Air Force.
 Wings operating the IM-99 BOMARC

LGM-30 Minuteman

The LGM-30 Minuteman, first flown in 1961 was developed to replace the hazards inherent in the caustic, volatile liquid-fuel systems of the Atlas and Titan ICBMs. Two innovations gave the Minuteman a long practical service life: a solid rocket booster making the Minuteman faster to launch than other ICBMs, and a digital flight computer, one of the first recognizably modern embedded systems.

 Wings operating LGM-30 Minuteman

General Dynamics BGM-109 Gryphon

The General Dynamics BGM-109G Gryphon was a ground-launched cruise missile developed by the United States Air Force in the last decade of the Cold War with a W80 warhead.It was developed as a counter to the mobile nuclear missiles deployed by the Soviet Union in Eastern Bloc European countries.    It was removed from service under the Intermediate-Range Nuclear Forces Treaty.  

 Wings operating BGM-109 Gryphon

LGM-118 Peacekeeper

The LGM-118 Peacekeeper, initially known as the MX (for Missile-eXperimental), was a land-based ICBM. A total of 50 missiles were deployed.  They were withdrawn from service by  2005 to comply with the Strategic Arms Limitation Talks.  Armed with up to 10 re-entry vehicles, each carrying a W87 warhead, the Peacekeeper was the most powerful ICBM deployed by the United States.

 Wings operating LGM-118 Peacekeeper

Multiple missile systems
 Wings operating multiple missile systems

References

Notes
 Explanatory notes

 Citations

Bibliography

  (Homeland Security Digital Library link to .pdf)
 
 
 
 
 

 Further reading
 
 
  (link to Google Books partial text)

 *
missile